Perry John Rendell (born 20 January 1970) is a former English cricketer who played three List A cricket matches in 1990 and 1991. He was a right-handed batsman and a right-arm medium pace bowler. He made his debut for Somerset, playing against the touring Sri Lankans in 1990, and then appeared twice for the Combined Universities in the 1991 Benson and Hedges Cup.

References

1970 births
English cricketers
Herefordshire cricketers
People from Weston-super-Mare
Somerset cricketers
Living people
British Universities cricketers